Dikson is a port located in northern Russia and is one of the world's northernmost settlements. Dikson is an urban locality (an urban-type settlement) situated in Taymyrsky Dolgano-Nenetsky District of Krasnoyarsk Krai. It is situated on the Kara Sea, located on a headland at the mouth of the Yenisei Gulf (the Yenisei River estuary), on Russia's Arctic Ocean coast. As of the 2021 Census, its population was 319.

Geography

Dikson is the northernmost port in Russia and the northernmost settlement on the Asian continent. It is so far north that no civil twilight appears from 8 December to 5 January, but it has 24 hours of civil twilight from 18 April to 26 August. It is one of the world's most isolated settlements. Dikson's inhabitants informally call their settlement "Capital of the Arctic", taken from a popular Soviet song.

Dikson and Dikson Island were named after Swedish Arctic pioneer Baron Oscar Dickson. Dickson, along with Aleksandr Mikhaylovich Sibiryakov, was the patron of a number of early Arctic expeditions, including Adolf Erik Nordenskiöld's Russian Arctic explorations.

Demographics
The population crashed following the demise of the Soviet Union, like many other cities in the far north of Russia, as the perceived lack of economic prospects by many of the residents resulted in large-scale emigration from the region. 

Children under age 12 make up 20% of the population, compared to 15% nationwide.

Climate
Dikson has a tundra climate (Köppen: ET)  where arboreal vegetation is unknown. For a polar climate temperatures are relatively moderate, similar to coastal Antarctica. Its climate is semiarid (below 350 mm annual precipitation) but covered with ice and snow. Pitch precipitation is in dry form. Usually, in these climates in the warmest month, most of the days feature temperatures below 10 °C, however on some occasions the city can have fresh summers instead of cold, with temperatures between 15 and 18 °C. For most of the year, the temperatures are below freezing which results in long and rigorous winters.

Liquid precipitation is concentrated between late spring and early fall. Temperatures do not fall below −50 °C as happens in much lower latitudes due to marine moderation. The place is known for pronounced climate change, with the highest Arctic temperatures, correlated with permafrost and marine ice pack  melting. It has experienced the fastest warming in recent decades.

See also
Dikson Airport

References

 Urban-type settlements in Krasnoyarsk Krai
 Port cities and towns in Russia
 Kara Sea
 Populated places of Arctic Russia
1915 establishments in the Russian Empire
 Populated places established in 1915
 Road-inaccessible communities of Krasnoyarsk Krai
Taymyrsky Dolgano-Nenetsky District